Golem Papradnik is a village in the municipality of Centar Župa, North Macedonia.

Demographics
Golem Papradnik has traditionally been inhabited by a Muslim Macedonian speaking (Torbeš) population.

As of the 2021 census, Golem Papradnik had 443 residents with the following ethnic composition:
Turks 329
Persons for whom data are taken from administrative sources 79
Macedonians 22
Albanians 11
Others 2

According to the 2002 census, the village had a total of 840 inhabitants. Ethnic groups in the village include:
Turks 799
Macedonians 30
Albanians 1
Others 10

References

Villages in Centar Župa Municipality
Macedonian Muslim villages